The Way of the Tiger is a series of adventure gamebooks by Mark Smith and Jamie Thomson, originally published by Knight Books (an imprint of Hodder & Stoughton) from 1985. They are set on the fantasy world of Orb. The reader takes the part of a young monk/ninja, named Avenger, initially on a quest to avenge his foster father's murder and recover stolen scrolls. Later books presented other challenges for Avenger to overcome, most notably taking over and ruling a city.

The world of Orb was originally created by Mark Smith for a Dungeons and Dragons game he ran while a pupil at Brighton College in the mid-1970s. Orb was also used as the setting for the 1984 Fighting Fantasy gamebook Talisman of Death, and one of the settings in the 1985 Falcon gamebook Lost in Time, both by Smith and Thomson.

Each book has a disclaimer at the front against performing any of the ninja related feats in the book as "They could lead to serious injury or death to an untrained user".

The sixth book, Inferno!, ends on a cliffhanger with Avenger trapped in the web of the Black Widow, Orb's darkest blight. As no new books were released, the fate of Avenger and Orb was unknown. Mark Smith has confirmed that the cliffhanger ending was deliberate.

In August 2013, the original creators of the series were working with Megara Entertainment to develop re-edited hardcover collector editions of the gamebooks (including a new prequel (Book 0) and sequel (book 7)), and potentially a role-playing game based on the series. The two new books plus the six re-edited original books were reprinted in paperback format  by Megara Entertainment in 2014, and made available as PDFs in 2019.

Books and publication history
The original series comprises six books:
 Avenger! (1985)
 Assassin! (1985)
 Usurper! (1985)
 Overlord! (1986)
 Warbringer! (1986)
 Inferno! (1987)

The sixth book ended on a cliffhanger, which was not resolved until 27 years later. Interviewed in 2012, Mark Smith explained: "Our publishers Hodder and Stoughton originally had signed for seven books but they cancelled the last in a fit of pique, which is why Inferno! ends so unsatisfactorily – they re-wrote the end themselves to kill the series. The story here is that the then CEO of Hodder, Eddie Bell, left to become CEO of Harper Collins ... He took us with him so that we could write the DuelMaster series for Harper Collins and Hodder revoked the contract for Book #7 in revenge. They said it was for commercial reasons, but the series was still successful and reprinting."

Ninja! (a prequel by David Walters) and Redeemer! (by all three writers) were added in 2014.

The books could be played in sequence or as standalone adventures, although playing them in sequence preserves the continuity of the storyline. If played in sequence, any abilities, bonuses, penalties or special items Avenger had acquired carried over to the next book.

The expanded eight-book series consists of the following titles (the first and the last having been printed many years after the original six):

Ninja! by David Walters
Avenger! by Mark Smith & Jamie Thomson
Assassin! by Mark Smith & Jamie Thomson
Usurper! by Mark Smith & Jamie Thomson
Overlord! by Mark Smith & Jamie Thomson
Warbringer! by Mark Smith & Jamie Thomson
Inferno! by Mark Smith & Jamie Thomson
Redeemer! by David Walters, Mark Smith & Jamie Thomson

Features
The series featured a combat system based on unarmed fighting moves with colourful names, such as the Cobra Strike punch, or Leaping Tiger kick. Avenger could also choose from a list of ninja skills such as Acrobatics or Poison Needle spitting, and used a variety of appropriate weaponry, such as a garotte and shuriken. Luck also played in part in the form of Fate tests to see if Fate smiled on you, or turned her back. Avenger could also enhance his skill by using "Inner Force", similar to qi energy.

During the series Avenger could learn new skills, such as "Shinren," a means of understanding people's intentions by observing subtle clues.

Characters
The books had a large number of opponents and recurring characters.

Enemies
Tyutchev, Cassandra and Thaum - A trio of chaos worshippers, who revere the chaos god Anarchil. They are recurring antagonists of Avenger throughout the series. Those three characters are also featured in Fighting Fantasy book 11, Talisman of Death, where they oppose the player for the titular item.
Cassandra - A warrior noted for her beauty, speed and swordsmanship. Wields a magical coldsword and wears a patchwork armor suit.
Tyutchev - This thief wears a magical cloak that blends with the dark, and wields a bastard sword taller than he is. His hair is dyed a bright corn yellow.
Thaum - a master of magic and especially illusion. "Devious looking" and wears a large gold earring.
Olvar the Chaos Bringer - A chaos-worshipping barbarian warrior and friend of Tyutchev, Cassandra and Thaum. His death at Avenger's hands (after an unprovoked attack by Olvar) leads to the feud between Avenger and the chaos worshippers. Wears a magical headband that can fire lightning bolts, and feels no pain in combat due to his bloodlust.
The Monks of the Scarlet Mantis - An order of evil monks who worship Vile, Kwon's evil brother. Like the followers of Kwon, the members of the Scarlet Mantis are consummate martial artists.
Yaemon, the Grand Master of Flame - Head of the Monks of the Scarlet Mantis, an order of monks opposed to the monks who follow Kwon. At the beginning of the series he has been Grand Master for more than twenty summers. He slew Avenger's foster father Naijishi and stole the Scrolls of Kettsuin. Possibly the most deadly martial artist on Orb, Yaemon is allied to Manse the Deathmage and Honoric, the leader of the Legion of the Sword of Doom and in the first book, Avenger, your quest calls for you to defeat Yaemon and so avenge the death of your father.
Aiguchi the Weaponmaster - A monk of the Scarlet Mantis and a master of weapons, he challenges Avenger to a duel in the Ring of Vasch-Ro to avenge the death of Yaemon. Expert with the bow, naginata and nunchaku.
Mandrake, Guildmaster of Assassins - Worships Torremalku the Slayer, the patron god of assassins, and is the most deadly assassin on Orb. "No-one has ever survived his attention." Master of disguise and acting.
Manse the Deathmage - An evil sorcerer and worshipper of Nemesis, Manse can cast many different spells, including the nearly always fatal "Finger of Death". Has been known to practice child sacrifice. In the prequel Ninja, he also appears as a behind-the-scenes antagonist, plaguing Avenger and his fellow contestants with his evil magic.
Honoric, Grand Marshal of the Legion of the Sword of Doom - One of the most feared military commanders and most evil men on Orb. A peerless swordsman, it is said he once slew a storm giant singlehandedly. Wields Sorcerak, an intelligent magical sword forged by his patron deity that dispels magic, causes fear in its wielders opponents, and enables its wielder to fly.
The Ninja of the Way of the Scorpion - A group of evil ninja who worship Nemesis and follow the Way of the Scorpion, an evil counterpart to the Way of the Tiger. Unlike the disciples of the Tiger, the Scorpion Ninja specialize in the use of various weapons.
The Grandmaster of Shadows - The leader of the ninja who follow the Way of the Scorpion. Uses deception, trickery and his ability to create magical darkness in combat.
The Impostor - A Scorpion Ninja who is sent to Irsmuncast to establish a rule of evil while Avenger is absent on a quest in the Rift. Equipped by Irsmuncast's priests of Nemesis with two magical items which formerly belonged to Mandrake.
Everyman - A golem bodyguard which is stolen and sent to kill Avenger. It is said that he must be killed one hundred times before he can die.
The Fiend - Sent by the gods of evil to capture Avenger's soul.
Astaroth, Seventh Duke of Hell - "The Usurper", the ruler of Irsmuncast nigh Edge who seized power after Avenger's real father (the rightful ruler of Irsmuncast) was slain by Yaemon.
Foxglove - The beautiful leader of the Order of the Yellow Lotus and priestess of Nemesis in Irsmuncast. Cunning and manipulative, she at times attempts to seduce the Avenger, but is not to be trusted. In Inferno! and Redeemer! she has become a slave of Nullaq in the Rift.

Allies
Glaivas - A Ranger Lord and excellent swordsman, Glaivas is a friend and ally of Avenger.
Doré le Jeune - A paladin and ally of Avenger. Undertakes regular expedition to the Rift to combat Evilspawn.
The Followers of Kwon - An order revering Kwon the Redeemer, dedicated to combating evil on Orb. The order consists of both monks and ninja, all of them skilled in unarmed combat techniques. Following their banishment from the Island of Plenty during the Black Lotus Rebellion, the order settled on the Island of Tranquil Dreams.
Gorobei - A monk and fellow worshipper of Kwon. Expert wrestler and skilled martial artist, although not as fast as Avenger. In Ninja and Avenger, he is a contestant for the title of Grandmaster of the Five Winds, the inner circle of the order's supreme masters.
Parsifal - The head monk of Kwon in the city of Irsmuncast nigh Edge. He is murdered by Mandrake, and his likeness adapted by the assassin in an attempt on Avenger's life.
Aiko - A female ninja like Avenger, and a contestant for the title Grandmaster of the Five Winds in Ninja. She is killed by Manse the Deathmage, and her spirit is subsequently captured for a foul necromantic ritual.
Daon - Another contestant for the title Grandmaster of the Five Winds in Ninja. A temperamental young monk who fled the Island of Plenty as a young boy.
Chigeru - An elderly monk of Kwon and another contestant for the title Grandmaster of the Five Winds in Ninja. He is killed during his quest for the Grandmaster title by a demonically transformed creature.
Togawa - A monk of Kwon and a mystic. Has knowledge of extremely powerful martial arts attacks, and can travel to the spirit plane. If Avenger visits him, the monk will teach a powerful new kick, "Kwon's Flail," which proves a valuable attack against enemies inexperienced with the move.
The Spirit Tiger - Kwon's servantess, who aids Avenger from the spirit plane.
Taflur, Thybault, Vespers and Eris - A group of adventurers who Avenger aids in their battle against an undead warlord, who in turn heal him of the plague and come to his aid in a confrontation with the worshippers of Chaos.
Force Lady Gwyneth - Leader of the Shieldmaidens of Dama in the city of Irsmuncast nigh Edge.
The Demagogue - Another faction leader in Irsmuncast Nigh Edge. While neither a warrior or skillful politician, he is a superb orator and crowd-swayer and considers himself the spokesman of the common people.
Csaky - Daughter of a Loremaster of Serakub, and Avenger's cousin, who makes her living as an adventurer using thieving skills (although she dislikes being called a thief, preferring the title "Wanderer"). She appears in Redeemer to aid Avenger in infiltrating the royal palace of Irsmuncast after it has been taken over by the Impostor.

Others
Runeweaver - A warrior who can fire magical bolts from his sword.
Antocidas the One-Eyed - Leader of the mercenaries in the city of Irmsuncast nigh Edge.
Golspiel - Corrupt but silver-tongued head of the merchants guild in Irsmuncast. He is a scheming opportunist who sides with whatever party promises him the most bountiful spoils.

Gods
Aside from certain ancient titans called "Elder Gods", Orb is ruled by various deities.

Video games
Two video games based on the books were released. The first, The Way of the Tiger, is a beat 'em up released by Gremlin Graphics for the Amstrad CPC, ZX Spectrum, MSX , Commodore 16 and Commodore 64. This game has Avenger fighting with staves and swords as well as utilizing unarmed combat (Avenger rarely used weapons apart from shuriken in the books).

Way of the Tiger II: Avenger is an action-adventure made by Gremlin Graphics in 1986, for the computers Commodore 64, Amstrad CPC, ZX Spectrum and MSX. In the game's story, Yaemon the Grand Master of Flame has killed the player's foster-father Naijish and stolen the Scrolls of Kettsuin. To recover the scrolls, the player has to find enough keys to penetrate the Quench Heart Keep, and then kill each of the three guards. The game is viewed from top-down perspective  and superficially resembles Gauntlet.

Reception
Chris Elliott reviewed Assassin! and Avenger!''' for White Dwarf #71, giving it an overall rating of 8 out of 10, and stated that "Plot and atmosphere may be a bit 'Kung Fu meets AD&D', but both add a few new twists to the adventure gamebook formula, and deserve credit for that. Overall, good entertainment value."

In the inaugural issue of The Games Machine'', John Woods noted that "the great appeal of these books is the detailed unarmed combat system. The rules have illustrations of the great variety of kicks, punches and throws available, and the player selects the best move to use against each opponent."

See also
Choose Your Own Adventure
Fighting Fantasy, Advanced Fighting Fantasy
Legends of Skyfall
Lone Wolf

References

External links

Book related
Megara Entertainment
Way of the Tiger at gamebooks.org

Video game related
Way of the Tiger at World of Spectrum
 Avenger at GameBase64

 Avenger at Ready64 

Books by Mark Smith (author)
Books by Jamie Thomson
Fantasy gamebooks
Gamebooks
Ninja fiction
Series of books
1986 video games
Amstrad CPC games
Commodore 64 games
MSX games
Video games about ninja
Video games developed in the United Kingdom
ZX Spectrum games
Japan in non-Japanese culture